John William Maloney (22 August 1883 – 3 June 1954) was a Liberal Member of Parliament (MP) in the House of Commons of Canada for the constituency of Northumberland, from 1945 to 1949.

Born in Nelson, New Brunswick, Maloney was a lumber merchant.

External links
 

1883 births
1954 deaths
Liberal Party of Canada MPs
Members of the House of Commons of Canada from New Brunswick